İnci Sözlük was a Turkish online social community website. The website is often compared to 4chan and regarded as the Turkish version of it.

On the official webpage of the community there were stars for famous pranks they organized.  It was the first to announce an anomaly in Twitter's code on May 10, 2010. Unscrupulous users were able to exploit this bug to add unconfirmed users to members' "following" list. The community also abused the translation function of facebook by mass-voting for dirty and suggestive translations. The community is also widely Blamed for the hoax regarding Atilla Taş, a Turkish pop singer who they started labelling as Greek (in order to put the blame on Greeks) after the release of his Gangnam Style parody "Yam Yam Style", which was widely criticised in Turkey.

References

Turkish social networking websites

Internet properties disestablished in 2023
Defunct social networking services